Out Woods is a 14.3 hectare biological Site of Special Scientific Interest in Wiltshire, notified in 1975. It is an ancient Ash-Maple woodland noted for containing rare species of ground flora.

Sources

 Natural England citation sheet for the site (accessed 21 March 2021)

External links
 Natural England website (SSSI information)

Sites of Special Scientific Interest in Wiltshire
Sites of Special Scientific Interest notified in 1975